A. F. Murison, MA, LLD, KC. (3 March 1847 – 8 June 1934) was a professor of Roman law and jurisprudence at University College, London and at the University of Oxford. He was a prolific writer for newspapers and journals in a wide variety of subjects with comparatively few publications in his specialism of Roman Law. He collated the text of Theophilus' Greek  of Justinian's Institutes but failed to finish his extensive work in this field. However, his translation of Theophilus was published in 2010 as the parallel English text accompanying the Greek in the new edition. He also wrote two biographical works in Scottish history: Sir William Wallace (1898) and King Robert the Bruce (1899) in the Famous Scots Series published by Oliphant, Anderson and Ferrier. Lack of money took him into journalism and he was editor of the Educational Times (now the Times Educational Supplement) from 1902 to 1912 and on the staff of the Daily Chronicle. He even had time to enter politics and he stood as a Liberal Party candidate in at least three General Elections: for the Glasgow and Aberdeen Universities constituency in 1906 and for the Glasgow Central constituency in December 1910 and January 1910 and lost on all three occasions to a Conservative candidate. He died on 8 June 1934 at his home in Clapham Common, London.

Origins in Scotland
Murison was born at New Deer, Aberdeenshire, Scotland on 3 March 1847. He was born to a crofting family and looked after cattle as a boy. He won a bursary to Aberdeen Grammar School where he excelled and won a scholarship to the University of Aberdeen. After achieving a first class honours M.A. degree in classics, he returned to his old school and was an English Master there from 1869 to 1876. He married Elizabeth Logan in 1870 and they had two children, Alexander Logan (1871) and James William (1872).  William (as he preferred to be called) became Chief Justice of the Straits Settlements.

Academic career in London and Oxford
 1876–81: Moved to London in 1876 and enrolled as trainee barrister in the Middle Temple and was called to the bar in 1881.
 1881–83:  Earned his living as a teacher, journalist, and legal practice before the Privy Council and the Chancery Division.
 1883–1925: Professor of Roman Law and later of Jurisprudence at University College, London.
 1912–24: Dean of the Faculty of Laws and member of the senate of the University of London. Also, in 1915, he became deputy reader in Roman Law at Oxford and then deputy professor of civil law in 1916.
 1925–34: Years of retirement and journalism.

Selected bibliography
 First Work in English: Grammar and Composition Taught by a Comparative Study of Equivalent Forms, Oxford University, 1875
 The Globe Readers, Books One to Five, London: Macmillan & Co., 1881–84.
 "A short history of Roman law" in W.A. Hunter, A Systematic and Historical Exposition of Roman Law in the Order of a Code, 2nd edition (London, 1885) 1–121 [repr. in 3rd ed. 1897; 4th ed. 1903]; usually referred to as "The External History of Roman Law"
 "Lex Dei," Classical Review 27 (1913) 274–277 [review of M. Hyamson, Mosicarum et Romanarum Legum Collatio (London, 1913)]
 W.A. Hunter (revised and enlarged by A.F. Murison), Introduction to Roman Law, 8th edition (London, 1921)
 Horace rendered in English verse (London, 1931)
 The Bucolics & Georgics of Vergil rendered in English hexameters (London, 1932)
 The Odes of Pindar rendered in English verse (London, 1933)
 The Iliad of Homer rendered in English hexameters, vol.1: Books I-XII (London, 1933)

 "The law in the Latin poets," in Atti del Congresso Internazionale di diritto romano: Roma 2 (Pavia, 1935) 607–639
 Schiller's Wallenstein: A Dramatic Poem rendered into English Verse. Translated by Alexander Falconer Murison. London: Longmans, Green & Co., 1931.

Footnotes

Sources

External links
 
 
 http://www.oxforddnb.com/view/article/35152
 http://www.electricscotland.com/history/other/murison_alexander.htm
 http://www.murison.net
 https://web.archive.org/web/20100508012100/http://www.ucl.ac.uk/history2/volterra/murison.htm

1847 births
1934 deaths
Scottish scholars and academics
People from Buchan
Scottish lawyers
Scottish biographers
Legal historians
Translators of Homer